Peter Leslie Ford (10 August 1933 – 17 July 2020) was an English footballer who played in the Football League for Port Vale and Stoke City. He later played for Macclesfield Town in the Cheshire County League.

Career
Ford began his career as an amateur with West Bromwich Albion, before joining Stoke City 1956. He was never able for force his way into the plans of manager Frank Taylor, and made just 14 Second Division appearances in three years at the Victoria Ground. He transferred to Port Vale, along with Harry Oscroft, in exchange for Dickie Cunliffe and £2,000 in September 1959. The club were competing in the Third Division after winning the Fourth Division title.

He played 25 league and six FA Cup games in the 1959–60 season. However he was diagnosed with Tuberculosis, along with teammate Terry Miles, and spent 12 weeks in hospital recovering after the disease was fortunately caught in the early stages. He missed just five league games in the 1960–61 campaign, and was a member of the side that won the Supporters' Clubs' Trophy. He was dropped by manager Norman Low in October 1961, and was used as a utility player in the 1961–62 and 1962–63 campaigns. He scored his first goal in the Football League on 3 September 1962, in a 4–2 win over Colchester United at Vale Park. He also scored goals against Southend United, Reading (2), Shrewsbury Town, and Gillingham, taking his tally to six goals in the 1962–63 season. He was released by manager Freddie Steele in the summer of 1963. He finished his career in the Cheshire County League with Macclesfield Town (122 appearances 5 goals) and Stafford Rangers. Upon his retirement from playing Ford became manager of Hanley Town, and later the coach of Milton United.

Personal life
Ford was the oldest of four boys and two girls. He became a plumber after retiring as a footballer.

Career statistics

Honours
Port Vale
Supporters' Clubs' Trophy: 1961

References

People from Etruria, Staffordshire
Footballers from Stoke-on-Trent
English footballers
Association football defenders
West Bromwich Albion F.C. players
Stoke City F.C. players
Port Vale F.C. players
Macclesfield Town F.C. players
Stafford Rangers F.C. players
English Football League players
English football managers
Hanley Town F.C. managers
British plumbers
1933 births
2020 deaths